Suburban Voodoo is the second solo studio album by English singer-songwriter Paul Carrack.  In between his previous solo album (1980's Nightbird) and this release, Carrack had been a member of Squeeze, singing lead on their 1981 hit "Tempted".

The band on this album, dubbed Noise To Go, was the result of arrangement between Nick Lowe and Carrack to provide backing on each other's albums.  The same group of musicians, but with Lowe as lead vocalist, is heard on Lowe's albums Nick the Knife (1982) and The Abominable Showman (1983).

The album reached #78 on the Billboard 200, and includes Carrack's first chart hit as a solo artist, "I Need You", which peaked at #37 in the US in October 1982.

Thirty years after the release of this LP, Carrack re-recorded the Suburban Voodoo album track "From Now On" (in a very different arrangement) for his 2012 album Good Feeling.

Reception

AllMusic's William Ruhlmann notes that Suburban Voodoo "sounds very much like a (Nick) Lowe album with Carrack singing. That's all to the good, though, since Carrack's supple voice is well-suited to Lowe's updated '60s rock & roll style."  Ruhlmann goes on to call Suburban Voodoo "an unusually tuneful album."  

Jim Green of Trouser Press also noted the Nick Lowe connection, writing that "Suburban Voodoo sounds like the souled-up flipside of Nick the Knife — if anything, it's better. Yet it succeeds because of Lowe's production and composing presence, which complements Carrack's excellent voice with the kind of pop smarts that bring out his best."

Track listing

Personnel 
Credits are adapted from the album's liner notes.
 Paul Carrack – lead and backing vocals, pianos, organ
 Martin Belmont – guitars
 James Eller – bass
 Bobby Irwin – drums, backing vocals
 Nick Lowe – backing vocals

Production 
 Producer – Nick Lowe
 Engineer – Paul Cobbold
 Mix Assistant – Chris Ludwinski
 Recorded at Rockfield Studios (Monmouth, Wales, UK).
 Mixed at Eel Pie Studios (London, UK).
 Photography – Brian Griffin

References

External links

1982 albums
Paul Carrack albums
Epic Records albums
Albums produced by Nick Lowe
Albums recorded at Rockfield Studios